Coulby Gunther (February 5, 1923 – July 14, 2005) was an American professional basketball player who spent two seasons in the Basketball Association of America (BAA) as a member of the Pittsburgh Ironmen (1946–47) and the St. Louis Bombers (1948–49). He played in the Professional Basketball League of America (PBLA) during the 1947–48 season, where he served as the player-coach of the Atlanta Crackers. Gunther also played for six teams in the American Basketball League (ABL). He attended Boston College.

BAA career statistics

Regular season

Playoffs

External links

1923 births
2005 deaths
American men's basketball players
Basketball players from New York City
Boston College Eagles men's basketball players
Forwards (basketball)
Pittsburgh Ironmen players
Professional Basketball League of America players
South Side High School (Rockville Centre) alumni
St. John's University (New York City) alumni
St. Louis Bombers (NBA) players
Undrafted National Basketball Association players